Lucie Havlíčková (born 13 March 2005) is a Czech tennis player.

She has career-high WTA rankings of 381 in singles and 370 in doubles, both achieved November 2022.

Havlíčková made her WTA Tour main-draw debut at the 2021 Prague Open, where she received wildcards into the singles and doubles main draws.

Havlíčková won the both 2022 French Open girls' singles and doubles title.

Junior career
Junior Grand Slam results - Singles:
 Australian Open: 1R (2022)
 French Open: W (2022)
 Wimbledon: –
 US Open: F (2022)

Junior Grand Slam results - Doubles:
 Australian Open: 2R (2022)
 French Open: W (2022)
 Wimbledon: –
 US Open: W (2022)

Performance timelines 

Only main-draw results in WTA Tour, Grand Slam tournaments, Fed Cup/Billie Jean King Cup and Olympic Games are included in win–loss records.

Singles 
Current after the 2023 Australian Open.

Doubles 
Current after the 2023 Australian Open.

ITF Circuit finals

Singles: 2 (1 title, 1 runner-up)

Doubles: 3 (1 title, 2 runner–ups)

Junior Grand Slam tournament finals

Girls' singles: 2 (1 title, 1 runner-up)

Girls' doubles: 2 (titles)

References

External links
 
 

2005 births
Living people
Czech female tennis players
French Open junior champions
Grand Slam (tennis) champions in girls' doubles
Grand Slam (tennis) champions in girls' singles
21st-century Czech women